Huanggang is a prefecture-level city in easternmost Hubei Province, China. It is situated to the north of the middle reaches of the Yangtze River and is bounded in the north by the Dabie Mountains and is named after Mount Huanggang. It borders Henan in the north, Anhui in the east and Jiangxi in the south.

In 2007, the city is named China's top ten livable cities by Chinese Cities Brand Value Report, which was released at the 2007 Beijing Summit of China Cities Forum.

History

In 845 BC Marquis Wen Huang Meng (also known as Huang Zhang / ) moved the capital of the State of Huang from Yicheng to Huangchuan (present-day Huangchuan, Henan). Huang Xi's descendants ruled State of Huang until 648 BC when it was destroyed by the State of Chu. The Marquis of Huang, Marquis Mu Huang Qisheng, fled to the state of Qi. The people of Huang were forced to relocate to Chu. They settled in the region of present-day Hubei province, in a region known as the Jiangxia Prefecture during the Han dynasty (206 BC-AD 220). There are many places in this region today that were named after Huang e.g. Huanggang, Huangpi, Huangmei, Huangshi, Huangan, Huangzhou etc. Many of the people of Huang were also relocated to regions south of the Yangtze River.
During the reign of Emperor Cheng of Jin, Later Zhao forces inflicted great damage on many Jin cities and bases north of the Yangtze and captured Zhucheng (in modern Huanggang, Hubei).
Huanggang has a history of at least 2,000 years.

Administration

Huanggang administers 12 county-level divisions, including one district, two county-level cities and seven counties:

Climate

Cultural heritage

Education
Huanggang Normal University is a full-time institution of higher education located in the city of Huanggang.

Economy

Transportation
Huanggang enjoys an excellent transportation infrastructure. There is an extensive road network, with three north–south and seven east–west major roads within the main city area. The city also is served by several new expressways, including the north–south "Jingzhu" (Beijing to Zhuhai, Guangdong) expressway and the east–west Wuhan to Shanghai expressway. Huanggang also is on the main north–south "Jingjiu" (Beijing to Hong Kong) and "Jingguang" (Beijing to Guangzhou, Guangdong) railway lines.

Bridges

Two bridges connect Huanggang across the Yangtze to the Ezhou on the south bank of the river:
 Ehuang Bridge, between the main urban area of Huanggang and Ezhou; it carries the China National Highway 106.
 Edong Bridge carries the G45 Daqing–Guangzhou Expressway and the G50 Shanghai–Chongqing Expressway.

Other river crossings near Huanggang include:
Jiujiang Yangtze River Bridge, between Huangmei County and Jiujiang; a combined road-rail bridge, it carries the Huangxiao Expressway, China National Highway 105,  and the Beijing–Kowloon railway
Huangshi Bridge, which carries the Huanghuang Expressway from Xishui County to Huangshi

Rail
Huanggang is served by the Beijing–Kowloon Railway, which has several stations within the prefecture-level city. Huanggang travelers can also use the Huangshi station on the Wuhan–Jiujiang Railway, across the river.

Famous people
Huanggang prefecture is the birthplace of numerous famous Chinese inventors, scientists, and scholars, including:
 Bi Sheng (毕昇), the inventor of movable type printing (Also known as one of the Four Great Inventions);
 Dayi Daoxin (四祖道信), the 4th Patriarch of Chán(Zen) Buddhism;
 Daman Hongren (五祖弘忍), the 5th Patriarch of Chán Buddhism;;
 Li Shizhen (李时珍), herbalist and author of the ancient medical classic Compendium of Materia Medica;
 Cheng Yi (程颐), ancient idealist philosopher;
 Cheng Hao (程顥), founder of Neo-Confucianism, philosopher and politician in Song Dynasty; 
 Dong Biwu (董必武), Acting President of the People's Republic of China, 1972–1975;
 Li Xiannian (李先念), former military leader and President of China;
 Lin Biao (林彪), former military leader and Vice President of China. One of the ten marshals in China;
 Chen Tanqiu (陈谭秋), a founding member of the Chinese Communist Party (CCP)
 Bao Huiseng (包惠僧), a founding member of the Chinese Communist Party (CCP)
 Li Siguang (李四光), ethnic Mongol ecologist;
 Wen Yiduo (闻一多), patriotic poet;
 Xiong Shili (熊十力), a 20th-century Chinese philosopher;
 Huang Kan (黄侃), a Chinese philologist.

As well, Huanggang is famous for producing military and political leaders. Hong'an County is known as the "County of Generals" in that more than 400 Chinese army generals have been born there, a total far greater than for any other county in all of China. In addition, former military leader and President of China, Li Xiannian (1909–1992), was born in Hong'an. The family of Taiwanese author Kuo Cheng came from Huanggang.

References

Citations

Bibliography
 Lin Biao. "Lin Piao: Master Strategist". In Snow, Helen Foster (Ed.). The Chinese Communists: Sketches and Autobiographies of the Old Guard. Westport, Connecticut: Greenwoods Publishing Company. 1972.

External links

 Google Maps Huanggang

 
Cities in Hubei
Populated places on the Yangtze River
Prefecture-level divisions of Hubei
Wuhan urban agglomeration